Sergey Verlin (Сергей Верлин; born 12 October 1974 in Voronezh) is a Russian sprint canoeist who competed in the mid-to-late 1990s. He won a bronze medal in the K-4 1000 m event at the 1996 Summer Olympics in Atlanta.

Verlin also won seven medals at the ICF Canoe Sprint World Championships with four golds (K-4 200 m: 1994, 1997; K-4 500 m: 1994, 1995), two silvers (K-2 200 m: 1998, K-4 500 m: 1995), and a bronze (K-4 1000 m: 1998).

After retiring, Verlin went into politics, standing as a candidate for the United Russia party of Vladimir Putin. Since 2004 he has been a coach of the Russian national kayak squad.

References

External links
 

1974 births
Canoeists at the 1996 Summer Olympics
Living people
Olympic canoeists of Russia
Olympic bronze medalists for Russia
Russian male canoeists
Russian politicians
Olympic medalists in canoeing
ICF Canoe Sprint World Championships medalists in kayak
Sportspeople from Voronezh
Medalists at the 1996 Summer Olympics